Conceição de Tavira is a former civil parish in the municipality of Tavira, Portugal. In 2013, the parish merged into the new parish Conceição e Cabanas de Tavira.

References

Former parishes of Tavira